Stamatios Lenis (born 11 October 1978) is a Greek athlete. He competed in the men's triple jump at the 2000 Summer Olympics.

References

1978 births
Living people
Athletes (track and field) at the 2000 Summer Olympics
Greek male triple jumpers
Olympic athletes of Greece
Place of birth missing (living people)